Sleman United Football Club (simply known as Sleman United) is an Indonesian football club based in Sleman, Special Region of Yogyakarta. They currently compete in the Liga 3 and their homebase is Tridadi Stadium.

Players

Current squad

Honours
 Liga 3 Special Region of Yogyakarta
 Champions (2): 2014, 2019
 Runner-up (1): 2021

References

External links

Football clubs in the Special Region of Yogyakarta
Football clubs in Indonesia
Association football clubs established in 2012
2012 establishments in Indonesia